Industry Shakedown is the second studio album by American East Coast hip hop artist Freddie Foxxx, and his first release under his 'Bumpy Knuckles' alias. It was released on June 27, 2000, via KJAC Music and Landspeed Records, and was produced by DJ Premier, Pete Rock, Diamond D, The Alchemist and Foxxx himself. It also featured guest appearances from Afrika Bambaataa, M.O.P., Terisa Griffin, and DJ Rukas. The album peaked at number 179 on the Billboard 200. The first single was the DJ Premier-produced "Part Of My Life".

Track listing

Personnel
James F. Campbell – main artist, producer (tracks: 2, 5, 7-8, 10, 16-18)
Eric Murray – featured artist (tracks: 11, 18)
Jamal Grinnage – featured artist (track 18)
Terisa Griffin – featured artist (track 7)
Lance Taylor – featured artist (track 4)
Peter O. Philips – producer (tracks: 6, 9, 13)
Daniel Alan Maman – producer (tracks: 3, 15)
Christopher Edward Martin – producer (tracks: 14, 19)
Joseph Kirkland – producer (track 11)
Lloyd Price – executive producer
Trevor "Karma" Gendron – art direction & design
Lordz of Brooklyn – illustration

Charts

References

External links

2000 albums
Freddie Foxxx albums
Albums produced by Diamond D
Albums produced by Pete Rock
Albums produced by DJ Premier
Albums produced by the Alchemist (musician)